{{safesubst:#invoke:RfD|||month = March
|day = 20
|year = 2023
|time = 19:21
|timestamp = 20230320192118

|content=
REDIRECT History of the Jews in San Francisco

}}